In enzymology, a 8-hydroxyquercetin 8-O-methyltransferase is an enzyme that catalyzes the chemical reaction

S-adenosyl-L-methionine + 3,5,7,8,3',4'-hexahydroxyflavone  S-adenosyl-L-homocysteine + 3,5,7,3',4'-pentahydroxy-8-methoxyflavone

Thus, the two substrates of this enzyme are S-adenosyl methionine and 3,5,7,8,3',4'-hexahydroxyflavone (gossypetin), whereas its two products are S-adenosylhomocysteine and 3,5,7,3',4'-pentahydroxy-8-methoxyflavone.

This enzyme belongs to the family of transferases, specifically those transferring one-carbon group methyltransferases.  The systematic name of this enzyme class is S-adenosyl-L-methionine:3,5,7,8,3',4'-hexahydroxyflavone 8-O-methyltransferase. Other names in common use include flavonol 8-O-methyltransferase, flavonol 8-methyltransferase, S-adenosyl-L-methionine:3,3',4',5,7,8-hexahydroxyflavone, 8-O-methyltransferase, and 8-hydroxyquercitin 8-O-methyltransferase [mis-spelt].

References 

 

EC 2.1.1
Enzymes of unknown structure